The 2021 Liga 3 South Kalimantan was the sixth season of Liga 3 South Kalimantan as a qualifying round for the national round of the 2021–22 Liga 3.

Persetala Tanah Laut were the defending champion.

Teams
There are 14 teams participated in the league this season, divided into 2 groups of seven.

Group stage

Group A

Group B

Knockout stage

References

Liga 3